The Young Wong Fei-hung was a 30 episode TV series that aired in China in 2002.

Plot
The series follows the growth of a teenage Huang Feihong (played by Ashton Chen) from being naughty to behaving like a man. During the first 5 episodes Huang Feihong is living in his hometown in Guangzhou, China. There he and his friend Lin Shilong, who was also his best friend and student in real life, goes along with him doing naughty things such as throwing a banana on the floor to deliberately trip a martial artist carrying a heavy statue, which almost smashed a little child. Huang also picks fights with other students in his school, especially the martial artist's son, who is a weak wimp. Later, Huang develops a friendship with the wimp. There are final bosses in each few episodes which can also be considered an arc. During the last arc, there is a final boss for the series.

References

See also
Wong Fei-hung filmography

2002 Chinese television series debuts
Television series set in the Qing dynasty
Mandarin-language television shows
Chinese action television series
Martial arts television series